Hillery may refer to:

People
Brian Hillery (born 1937), Irish businessman and politician
Fred A. Hillery (1854–1937), American Methodist
Jarrick Hillery (born 1976) American football player
Maeve Hillery, Irish doctor
Patrick Hillery (1923–2008), Irish politician and President of Ireland
Hillery Johnson, veteran record producer and record label founder

Places
Hillery, Illinois, U.S.

See also
Hilary (disambiguation)